Tes Lake is a natural tourist attraction in the Lebong Regency. It is one of the largest lakes in Bengkulu Province. Tes Lake is the main hydroelectric (hydropower) supplier for nearly all of Bengkulu Province. The lake covers an area of approximately 750 hectares.

Area description 
According to the Decree of Forestry Minister No. 385/Kpts-II/1985, dated December 27, 1985, Tes Lake covers an area of 3,230 hectares.

Flora
Because of its hot and humid climate, crops such as coffee are mainly grown. Other florae that grow around the area are Meranti, Dyera costulata, Kayu Gadis, Pulai, Gelam, and other plants which also grow elsewhere in Bengkulu Province.

Fauna
Tes Lake is home to a variety of wildlife, including tigers, gibbons, monkeys, snakes, bears, various domestic birds, dogs, several species of domestic fish, and other creatures.

Location
Tes Lake lies in the south of Lebong Regency, Bengkulu. The nearby settlements include Karang Anyar, Kutai Donok (Central Village), Talang Ratu Village, and Tes Village.

Topography 
Its elevation is 600m to 900m above sea level.

Geology and climate
Based on information from an exploration conducted in 1964, the main types of soil found in Tes Lake are regosol, andosol, latosol, and podzol (brown podzol soil).

Due to its high number of wet seasons, Tes Lake experiences an average annual rainfall intensity of 2,700-3,500 mm. The area is classified as type A, with a Q value of approximately 0.9% - 7.7%, according to classifications from Schimidt and Ferguson.

References

Lebong Regency
Lakes of Sumatra
Landforms of Bengkulu
Tourist attractions in Bengkulu